The surname Antar is shared by:

Eddie Antar and Sam Antar, founders of the Crazy Eddie chain of electronics stores
Asia Ramazan Antar (1997–2016), Kurdish Fighter, feminist and soldier
Ángel Antar (born 1972), Paraguayan association footballer
Faisal Antar (born 1978), Lebanese footballer
Mohamed Antar (born 1993), Egyptian footballer
Roda Antar (born 1980), Lebanese football player and manager
Ziad Antar (born 1978), Lebanese filmmaker and photographer